Dr. B. R. Ambedkar Institute of Technology, established in 1984, is the oldest engineering college in Port Blair, in the Andaman and Nicobar Islands, India. It offers degree and diploma courses in engineering and maritime programmes. The institute also offers various non-formal courses in the campus as well as through its extension centre spread over different islands of Andaman and Nicobar Islands.  All the courses which are being offered for more than four years have been accredited by NBA.

History
Dr. B. R. Ambedkar Institute of Technology was established in 1984 as Dr. B. R. Ambedkar Govt. Polytechnic. In 1989, a second Govt. Polytechnic was established in the same campus. This college has been renamed as Dr. B. R. Ambedkar Institute of Technology in 2010, when engineering degree courses were introduced. The institute was one of the first technical institute in the country to get ISO 9000  accreditation way back in 1999, which was subsequently upgraded to 9001:2008  standards. The institute also obtained ISO 14000 accreditation.

Courses offered under Degree Programme
 Civil Engineering.
 Electronics & Communication Engineering.
 Computer Science Engineering.

Courses offered under Diploma Programme
 Civil Engineering
 Computer Engineering.
 Electrical Engineering.
 Electronics & Communication Engineering.
 Information and Technology.
 Mechanical Engineering.
 Hotel Management and Catering Technology
 Maritime course

DBRAIT Student Protest
In the year of 2022 ABVP Andaman & Nicobar Unit conducted a series of Protests & Strikes with the students of DBRAIT. The Protest was Centralized on Affiliation & Examination of the students. As the students of degree program were not provided with their university registration number the examinations of the students were not conducted from the year 2019.
 

On 6th June, first time ABVP protested with the students at the DBRAIT Campus main gate. During the one day protest ABVP State Joint Secretary Mr. Siddhanth Rai Sharma said:

On 1st September 2022, ABVP Student Leader of Andaman & Nicobar Islands Shri. Siddhanth Rai Sharma addressed the students of Dr. B. R Ambedkar Institute of Technology (DBRAIT) just before the "Mass Students Rally".

After his speech a large number of students marched to Secretariat, Port Blair, breaking the barricades and police human chains along the route. The local police failed to control the student agitation after his speech.

References

External links
 http://dbrait.andaman.gov.in

Port Blair
Universities and colleges in the Andaman and Nicobar Islands
Educational institutions established in 1984
1984 establishments in the Andaman and Nicobar Islands